Geraldo may refer to:

 Geraldo (bandleader) (1904–1974), English bandleader
 Geraldo (talk show), a daytime television tabloid talk show
 Geraldo Rivera, American television personality and host of Geraldo
 Geraldo Rocha Pereira (born 1994), Brazilian footballer
 Geraldo Moreira da Silva Júnior (born 1974), Brazilian footballer
 Geraldo (footballer, born 1991), Angolan footballer
 Geraldo (name), a given name

See also 
Giraldo
Heraldo